Edmonton County School is a coeducational all-through school and sixth form for pupils aged 4 to 18. The school is located over two sites in Edmonton in the London Borough of Enfield in north London, England.

Admissions
The Cambridge Campus (formerly the upper school until the end of 2009/2010 academic year) buildings are the site which was used by the former grammar school on the Great Cambridge Road (A10) near Bush Hill Park railway station. The Bury Campus (formerly the lower school until the end of 2009/2010 academic year) buildings are the site which was used by the former secondary modern school on Little Bury Street.

History

Grammar school
The school was founded in January 1919 as Edmonton Central School. It catered for both girls and boys, but originally they were taught in separate buildings. In 1922, Middlesex County Council took over the school from the Municipal Borough of Edmonton, and changed its name to Edmonton County Secondary School.

Later, the name was changed to Edmonton County Grammar School, reflecting the distinctions between types of secondary school in the Education Act 1944.

Comprehensive
In 1967, it was amalgamated with Rowantree Secondary Modern School to form a comprehensive school and was renamed Edmonton School, but was often referred to as 'Edmonton County'. The school was given its current name of Edmonton County School in 1996. It was granted the status of a specialist technical college in February 2003.

Academy
Previously a community school administered by Enfield London Borough Council, in September 2016 Edmonton County School converted to academy status. the school is now sponsored by the Edmonton Academy Trust.

Notable former pupils

 Kriss Akabusi, athlete
 Kevan James, cricketer
 Kelly Johnson, guitarist
 Debbie Kurup, actress
 Tijion Esho, cosmetic doctor and television personality 
 Kev Orkian, entertainer
 Martin Poll, priest
 Ray Winstone, actor
 Dan Gasser, presenter on Radio X

Edmonton County Grammar School
 John Berry, speedway promoter
 Bill Fay, singer-songwriter
 Prof John Hinch, Professor of Fluid Mechanics since 1998 at the University of Cambridge
 Basil Hoskins, actor
 Prof Annette Karmiloff-Smith CBE, psychologist researching language development
 Larry Lamb, actor
 Keith Mack, Controller of National Air Traffic Services from 1985 to 1988, and Director General from 1989 to 1993 of Eurocontrol
 Colin Parnell, founder of Decanter (magazine)
 Ronald Edward Perrin, organist
 Prof John G. Ramsay CBE, Professor of Geology from 1977 to 1992 at the University of Zurich
 Sir Roy Strong, historian
 Norman Tebbit, Baron Tebbit of Chingford, politician

References

External links
 Edmonton County School official website
 A detailed history of Education in Edmonton at British History Online
 Edmonton County Old Scholars Association

Educational institutions established in 1919
Secondary schools in the London Borough of Enfield
1919 establishments in England
Academies in the London Borough of Enfield
Primary schools in the London Borough of Enfield
Edmonton, London